Azelaoyl chloride or nonanedioyl dichloride is an organic compound with the formula (CH2)7(COCl)2. It is the diacid chloride derivative of azelaic acid. It is a colorless liquid although commercial samples can appear yellow.

References

External links 
 MSDS Safety data (PDF)

Acyl chlorides